Utthita Vasisthasana (sometimes shortened to Vasisthasana) (Sanskrit: उत्थित वसिष्ठासन utthita vasiṣṭhāsana) or Side Plank pose is a balancing asana in modern yoga as exercise.

Etymology and origins

The name of the pose comes from the Sanskrit उत्थित Utthita extended, वसिष्ठ Vasiṣṭha, a sage, and आसन āsana, "posture" or "seat".

The pose is not described in the medieval hatha yoga texts. It appears in the 20th century in the Ashtanga Vinyasa Yoga of Pattabhi Jois.

Description

The pose is a balancing posture with the body, both legs, and both arms straight, the body on one side. The upper arm is raised as high as possible. The upper leg may be rested on the lower leg, or for the full pose (sometimes called Eka Pada Vasisthasana, One-legged Side Plank) may be raised as high as possible; the upper hand may grasp the foot (sometimes called Vasisthasana B), and the gaze may be directed to the upper hand.

Variations

Chamatkarasana (from Sanskrit चमत्कार camatkār, miracle) or Wild Thing Pose keeps most of the body's weight on one foot and the hand on the same side, lifting the other elbow above the head, arm bend, and the other foot behind the knee, so the body faces the side and slightly upwards.

See also 

 Chaturanga Dandasana – low plank pose
 Kala Bhairavasana – like Vasisthasana but with one leg behind the neck

References

Balancing asanas
Core strength asanas
Asymmetric asanas